Calamity may refer to:

Arts, entertainment, and media
 Calamity (album), by The Curtains (2008)
 Calamity (board game), board game released by Games Workshop in 1983
 Calamity (film), 1982 Czechoslovak film
 Calamity, a Childhood of Martha Jane Cannary, 2020 animated film
 Calamity, the third book in the series The Reckoners by Brandon Sanderson
 Calamity Coyote, a fictional character in Tiny Toon Adventures
 Calamity James, a British comic book character from The Beano
 Calamity Jane (film), a 1953 film based on the person
 Calamity Town, a 1942 novel by Ellery Queen
 The Calamity, a central plot point for the 2011 video game Bastion

Other uses
 Disaster, a terrible event
 Al-Qaria (English: the calamity), the 101st sura of the Quran dealing with the end of time
Calamity Jane (1852–1903), American frontierwoman
Calamity Ganon, or simply Ganon, a character in The Legend of Zelda video game series

See also